"Hallelujah (So Low)" is a single by British indie rock band, Editors. The song is the second single off of their sixth studio album, Violence. The single was released on 21 February 2018 through PIAS Recordings.

Background and composition 
The song was written by Tom Smith when he was traveling through Oxfam and visited refugee camps in Northern Greece. Smith said that experiencing these camps was "obviously an incredibly moving trip, seeing people living in dust, surviving only on the help of others was very moving". Tom Smith of Editors said that he felt the song was the most "rock-oriented" song they have composed in their career.

Music video 
The music video was directed by Rahi Rezvani, who also directed the band's music videos from the previous album, In Dream. The music video features the band playing in a monochrome world with rain falling.

Reception 
Andrew Trendell of New Musical Express compared "Hallelujah (So Low)" to Depeche Mode calling it a blistering electronic rock song. Robin Murray of Clash called the track a "raw and brusied" digital production.

Charts

References

External links
 

2018 songs
2018 singles
Editors (band) songs
PIAS Recordings singles
Music videos directed by Rahi Rezvani
Songs written by Edward Lay
Songs written by Russell Leetch
Songs written by Tom Smith (musician)
Songs written by Justin Lockey
Songs written by Elliott Williams